"One on One" is a song performed by American musical duo Daryl Hall & John Oates. Written by member Daryl Hall, the song was released as the second single from their eleventh studio album H2O in January 1983. Backed by minimalistic, synthesizer-based production, the song's lyrics incorporate various sports metaphors to describe seduction. Daryl Hall performs lead vocals, while John Oates provides backing harmony vocals. It peaked at number seven on the United States Billboard Hot 100, becoming one of three top ten singles from H2O.

Music video
The song's music video, directed by Mick Haggerty and C.D. Taylor, depicts Hall walking around a city street singing the song, interspersed with shots of him performing on a stage with Oates. Robert Christgau of The Village Voice named it the eighth-best video of the year in his ballot for the annual Pazz & Jop critics' poll.

Reception
Cash Box praised the "straightforward vocals", "church-like synthesizer portion and a steady drum beat."  Billboard praised "Hall's convincing solo vocal."

"One on One" has been covered and sampled by various artists and was notably used in several commercials for the National Basketball Association.

Covers and samples
Smooth jazz saxophonist Warren Hill covered "One on One" for his fifth studio album Life Through Rose Coloured Glasses (1998). The song was also covered by indie pop duo The Bird and the Bee for their Hall & Oates tribute album Interpreting the Masters Volume 1: A Tribute to Daryl Hall and John Oates. Indie rock band Fruit Bats performed a live rendition of "One on One" for The A.V. Clubs "Undercover" song series. Alternative hip hop group Fun Lovin' Criminals sampled "One on One" for their song "Sugar", from their album 100% Colombian (1998).

The song's popularity and various lyrical references to basketball led to it being notably used in several National Basketball Association (NBA) commercials in the mid-1980s. One such commercial featured Los Angeles Lakers small forward James Worthy performing a 360-degree spin move in slow motion during the song's saxophone solo.

Chart performance

Weekly charts

Year-end charts

References

1983 singles
1981 songs
Hall & Oates songs
Songs written by Daryl Hall
RCA Records singles